Amlaoibh Ua Beolláin  was Archdeacon of Drumcliffe. He died in 1255.

References 

1225 deaths
13th-century Irish Roman Catholic priests
Archdeacons of Drumcliffe
Clergy from County Sligo